Faithful is a 1936 British musical drama film, directed by Paul L. Stein and starring Jean Muir and Hans Söhnker.

The film was made by Warner Brothers at Teddington Studios as a quota quickie production, with an original screenplay by Brock Williams and music by Pierre Neuville. Faithful is now classed as a lost film.

The plot deals with two pupils from a provincial music conservatory who elope, marry, and come to London to try their luck. The husband becomes a singer in a nightclub, and is soon targeted by a predatory socialite. They start an affair, the wife finds out about it and decides to leave her husband, until matters are smoothed over by a third-party who wishes the couple well.

Cast
 Jean Muir as Marilyn Koster
 Hans Söhnker as Carl Koster
 Chili Bouchier as Pamela Carson
 Gene Gerrard as Danny Reeves
 Margaret Yarde as Mrs. Kemp

References

Bibliography
 Chibnall, Steve. Quota Quickies: The Birth of the British 'B' Film. British Film Institute, 2007.

External links
 
 Faithful at BFI Film & TV Database

1936 films
1930s musical drama films
Films directed by Paul L. Stein
Lost British films
British black-and-white films
British musical drama films
Films set in London
Warner Bros. films
Films shot at Teddington Studios
Quota quickies
1936 drama films
1930s British films
1930s English-language films